Júlio César do Nascimento (born 20 October 1979) is a Brazilian footballer (midfielder) who plays for Al Khor of Qatar.

External links

1979 births
Living people
Clube Atlético Mineiro players
Brazilian footballers
Brazilian expatriate footballers
Sport Club do Recife players
Al Ahli SC (Doha) players
Al-Khor SC players
Al Shabab Al Arabi Club Dubai players
Qatar Stars League players
Expatriate footballers in Qatar
Expatriate footballers in the United Arab Emirates
Brazilian expatriate sportspeople in Qatar
Brazilian expatriate sportspeople in the United Arab Emirates
Association football midfielders
UAE Pro League players
Sportspeople from Recife